The City of Wanneroo is a local government area with city status in the northern suburbs of Perth, Western Australia. Wangara encompasses the federal divisions of Cowan, Moore and Pearce.

The city's main commercial and residential town centres are located at Wanneroo in the east and Clarkson in the north. Further urban centres are planned at Alkimos, Yanchep and Two Rocks in the future to coincide with rapid metropolitan expansion and development in the area. It is also home to the Yanchep and Neerabup National Parks, as well as the Neerabup Industrial Estate in the north.

From the city's inception until 1998, it also incorporated the neighbouring City of Joondalup in its entirety.

Geography
Wanneroo covers a land area totalling . The city is bounded by Beach Road and the City of Stirling to the south, Alexander Drive and the City of Swan to the east, Wanneroo Road and Lake Joondalup to the south-west, the Indian Ocean to the west and the Shire of Gingin to the north.

Wanneroo's population is concentrated in three locations: at the southern end centred on Girrawheen; in the region surrounding Wanneroo near the city's geographical centre; and along the northern Perth coastline centred on Clarkson, separated from Joondalup by the rural localities of Neerabup and Tamala Park. Land in the city's north and east is predominantly rural in character.

The City of Wanneroo encompasses one of Perth's busiest industrial areas, Wangara. It is situated roughly 20 km north of the central business district, and is the industrial hub of the north side of Perth. The suburb of Wangara is a hub for commercial manufacturing, vehicle dealerships, industrial glaziers and commercial distribution warehousing. It is also roughly 10 km from Joondalup, Perth's largest satellite city north of the Swan River.

History
Prior to 1902, Wanneroo was part of the Perth Road District, which eventually went on to become the City of Stirling. The Wanneroo Road District was established on 31 October 1902 under the Roads Act 1888. The board was named after the Wanneroo wetlands in the area, first explored and recorded by John Butler in 1834.

With the passage of the Local Government Act 1960, all road boards became shires effective from 1 July 1961, and the Shire of Wanneroo came into being, encompassing everything north of Beach Road and west of Alexander Drive. With the development of and subsequent population growth surrounding Joondalup, the Shire of Wanneroo attained City status on 31 October 1985.

On 1 July 1998, on the recommendation of a report by the Local Government Advisory Committee, the City of Wanneroo was bifurcated. The southwestern section, encompassing the urban centre of Joondalup, was separately incorporated as the new City of Joondalup. The remainder, including the inland suburbs east of Lake Joondalup and the coastal suburbs north of Burns Beach, formed a reduced Shire of Wanneroo, which quickly regained City status on 1 July 1999. As this was before the local government elections to elect a mayor and councillors, the second incarnation of the Shire did not have a Shire President.

Demographics
The City of Wanneroo has experienced significant population growth of almost 110,000 persons in the 15 years between the 2001 Census and 2016 Census. The city also has the second largest population of any local government area in greater Perth.

With less than 53% of the population having been born in Australia at the 2016 Census, Wanneroo has a large immigrant populace. Over 13% of Wanneroo's residents were born in the United Kingdom, compared to less than 4.0% nationwide. New Zealanders, Vietnamese and South Africans compose the city's most significant minority populations.

Suburbs
The suburbs of the City of Wanneroo with population and size figures based on the most recent Australian census:

Population

Pre-1998 composition

1998-Present composition

Transport
The City of Wanneroo is served by two major north–south arterial roads, Wanneroo Road and Marmion Avenue. The two roads run parallel to each other through Wanneroo's eastern and western suburbs respectively. A third north–south arterial route, the Mitchell Freeway, is proposed to be extended from Burns Beach Road through to Toreopango Avenue and beyond.

The City of Wanneroo has two railway stations in Clarkson and Butler. As a result of the Public Transport Plan for Perth 2031, the Clarkson rail line is proposed to be extended north to Yanchep with stations at Alkimos, Eglinton, and Yanchep.

Governance

The Wanneroo City Council operates out of the Council Chambers on Dundebar Road, Wanneroo.

The current mayor is Linda Aitken, who was elected in September 2022.

Elections are held every four years, for a mayor and 14 councillors across the city's seven electoral wards, covering 36 suburbs. Two councillors are elected to each of the wards.

Local government wards

Sister cities
Wanneroo has three sister cities. It was also formerly twinned with Sorrento in Italy, but this association was broken with the bifurcation of Wanneroo in 1998, when the Wanneroo suburb of Sorrento was incorporated into the City of Joondalup.
 Sinagra, Sicily, Italy
 Kastoria, Greece (1992)
 Guigang, Guangxi, China (2005)

Heritage listed places

As of 2023, 149 places are heritage-listed in the City of Wanneroo, of which 34 are on the State Register of Heritage Places, a large number of those located in Yanchep National Park .

References

External links
 

 
Wanneroo